Reginald Dennis "Reggie" Jones (born 1951) is a retired boxer from the United States, who represented his native country at the 1972 Summer Olympics. There he was controversially eliminated in the second round of the light middleweight division (– 71 kg) by Valeri Tregubov of the Soviet Union in a fight he was generally accepted to have won.

Born in Savannah, Georgia, Jones moved to Newark as a child, attending the public schools and graduating from Weequahic High School in 1969, where he played basketball and football, as well as running on the school's track team.

Jones took up boxing at Guantanamo Bay in Cuba while serving in the U.S. Navy. He won a bronze medal at the 1971 Pan American Games, two Marines and Interservice titles, and two North Carolina AAU titles. He turned professional after the 1972 Olympics, and became the New Jersey State Middleweight Champion when he beat Bobby Patterson over 12 rounds.  He would hold that title for the next two years, before he lost to fellow 2010 Inductee Rusty Rosenberger. After retiring from boxing he settled in Summit, New Jersey, to become a social worker with the Essex County Division of Welfare and then for 31 years with the New Jersey Division of Youth & Family Services, until his retirement in February 2016.

1972 Olympic results
Below is the record of Reggie Jones, an American light middleweight boxer who competed at the 1972 Munich Olympics:

 Round of 32: lost to Valeri Tregubov (Soviet Union) by decision, 2–3

Professional boxing record

|-
|align="center" colspan=8|16 Wins (8 knockouts, 8 decisions), 9 Losses (3 knockouts, 6 decisions), 1 Draw 
|-
| align="center" style="border-style: none none solid solid; background: #e3e3e3"|Result
| align="center" style="border-style: none none solid solid; background: #e3e3e3"|Record
| align="center" style="border-style: none none solid solid; background: #e3e3e3"|Opponent
| align="center" style="border-style: none none solid solid; background: #e3e3e3"|Type
| align="center" style="border-style: none none solid solid; background: #e3e3e3"|Round
| align="center" style="border-style: none none solid solid; background: #e3e3e3"|Date
| align="center" style="border-style: none none solid solid; background: #e3e3e3"|Location
| align="center" style="border-style: none none solid solid; background: #e3e3e3"|Notes
|-align=center
|Loss
|
|align=left| Bob "Hunter" Patterson
|PTS
|6
|23/04/1982
|align=left| East Orange, New Jersey, United States
|align=left|
|-
|Loss
|
|align=left| Bobby Czyz
|TKO
|7
|18/06/1981
|align=left| Totowa, New Jersey, United States
|align=left|
|-
|Win
|
|align=left| Greg Thomas
|KO
|2
|18/12/1980
|align=left| Totowa, New Jersey, United States
|align=left|
|-
|Loss
|
|align=left| Mustafa Hamsho
|TKO
|6
|29/03/1980
|align=left| Atlantic City, New Jersey, United States
|align=left|
|-
|Win
|
|align=left| Tyrone Freeman
|KO
|3
|29/06/1979
|align=left| Jersey City, New Jersey, United States
|align=left|
|-
|Loss
|
|align=left| Rusty Rosenberger
|MD
|12
|27/04/1979
|align=left| Newark, New Jersey, United States
|align=left|
|-
|Win
|
|align=left| Ray Kates
|SD
|12
|10/03/1979
|align=left| Woodbridge, New Jersey, United States
|align=left|
|-
|Win
|
|align=left| Charles "Hari" Carey
|PTS
|8
|09/09/1978
|align=left| Woodbridge, New Jersey, United States
|align=left|
|-
|Loss
|
|align=left| Ray "Baby" Smith
|PTS
|8
|16/08/1978
|align=left| Newark, New Jersey, United States
|align=left|
|-
|Win
|
|align=left| Roland Cousins
|KO
|3
|30/06/1978
|align=left| Newark, New Jersey, United States
|align=left|
|-
|Win
|
|align=left| John "Godfather" Martino
|PTS
|10
|30/11/1977
|align=left| Newark, New Jersey, United States
|align=left|
|-
|Win
|
|align=left| Roland Cousins
|KO
|3
|07/11/1977
|align=left| Durham, North Carolina, United States
|align=left|
|-
|Win
|
|align=left| Bob "Hunter" Patterson
|PTS
|12
|23/06/1977
|align=left| Newark, New Jersey, United States
|align=left|
|-
|Win
|
|align=left| Matt "Art" Donovan
|KO
|5
|26/05/1977
|align=left| McAfee, New Jersey, United States
|align=left|
|-
|Win
|
|align=left| Ali Perez
|PTS
|10
|25/04/1977
|align=left| Newark, New Jersey, United States
|align=left|
|-
|Draw
|
|align=left| Mustafa Hamsho
|PTS
|8
|16/08/1976
|align=left| Newark, New Jersey, United States
|align=left|
|-
|Win
|
|align=left| Alfonso Aguirre
|UD
|10
|26/07/1976
|align=left| New Orleans, Louisiana, United States
|align=left|
|-
|Win
|
|align=left|Butch Bostich
|KO
|1
|25/05/1976
|align=left| Alexandria, Louisiana, United States
|align=left|
|-
|Win
|
|align=left| Charles "Akbar Ali" Buckner
|SD
|6
|04/04/1976
|align=left| New Orleans, Louisiana, United States
|align=left|
|-
|Loss
|
|align=left| John "The Poll" Harris
|UD
|6
|31/01/1976
|align=left| Waterbury, Connecticut, United States
|align=left|
|-
|Loss
|
|align=left| Ali Perez
|PTS
|6
|26/09/1975
|align=left| Latham, New York, United States
|align=left|
|-
|Win
|
|align=left| Ali Perez
|PTS
|6
|05/08/1975
|align=left| Elizabeth, New Jersey, United States
|align=left|
|-
|Loss
|
|align=left| Bob "Paycheck" Payton
|PTS
|6
|20/02/1975
|align=left| Upper Darby, Pennsylvania, United States
|align=left|
|-
|Loss
|
|align=left| Chris "Back in" Black
|TKO
|1
|28/10/1974
|align=left| New York City, United States
|align=left|
|-
|Win
|
|align=left| Walter Riley
|KO
|1
|20/06/1974
|align=left| North Bergen, New Jersey, United States
|align=left|
|-
|Win
|
|align=left|Carlos Stevens
|KO
|4
|17/01/1974
|align=left| North Bergen, New Jersey, United States
|align=left|
|}

References

External links
 

1951 births
Living people
American male boxers
Boxers from Newark, New Jersey
Light-middleweight boxers
Olympic boxers of the United States
Boxers at the 1972 Summer Olympics
Boxers at the 1971 Pan American Games
Pan American Games bronze medalists for the United States
Pan American Games medalists in boxing
Sportspeople from Savannah, Georgia
Sportspeople from Summit, New Jersey
Weequahic High School alumni
Medalists at the 1971 Pan American Games
20th-century American people